A Corazón Abierto may refer to:

A Corazón Abierto (album), an album by Mexican pop singer Alejandro Fernández
A corazón abierto (Colombian TV series), a Colombian television series adapted from Grey's Anatomy
A corazón abierto (Mexican TV series), Mexican version of Colombian adaptation of Grey's Anatomy